The Desulfobulbaceae are a family of Thermodesulfobacteriota. They reduce sulphates to sulphides to obtain energy and are anaerobic.

The discovery of filamentous Desulfobulbaceae in 2012 elucidates the cause of the small electric currents measured in the top layer of marine sediment. The currents were first measured in 2010. These organisms, referred to as "cable bacteria", consist in thousands of cells arranged in filaments up to three centimeters in length. They transport electrons from the sediment that is rich in hydrogen sulfide up to the oxygen-rich sediment that is in contact with the water. Later investigations revealed their ability to use nitrate or nitrite as final electron acceptor in absence of  oxygen Since the discovery, cable bacteria have been reported from a wide variety of sediments worldwide. Based on phylogenetic analysis of 16s rRNA and dsrAB genes it was proposed to allocate cable bacteria within two novel candidate genera i.e. Ca. Electrothrix and Ca. Electronema.

Phylogeny
The currently accepted taxonomy is based on the List of Prokaryotic names with Standing in Nomenclature (LPSN) and National Center for Biotechnology Information (NCBI)

Notes

See also 
 List of bacterial orders
 List of bacteria genera

References 

 
 

Desulfobacterales